The Christmas Ships Parade, or Christmas Ship Parade, is an annual Christmas ships parade in Portland, Oregon, United States. The tradition was established by a single boat in 1954. The 57th annual parade was held in 2019. A virtual event was held in 2020, during the COVID-19 pandemic.

References

External links

 

1954 establishments in Oregon
Annual events in Portland, Oregon
Boat festivals
Christmas and holiday season parades
Christian processions
Christmas traditions
Parades in the United States
Recurring events established in 1954